Acrochordonichthys guttatus is a species of catfish of the family Akysidae. It is endemic to Borneo and only known from the Barito River drainage. A detailed discussion of this species's relationship with the other members of its genus can be found on Acrochordonichthys.

Acrochordonichthys guttatus grows to  standard length.

References

Akysidae
Endemic fauna of Borneo
Freshwater fish of Borneo
Fish described in 2001